Pieter van Senus (8 December 1903 – 23 September 1968) was a Dutch swimmer and water polo player. He competed in the men's 100 metre backstroke event at the 1924 Summer Olympics and the water polo at the 1928 Summer Olympics.

Pieter is the younger brother of water polo player Han van Senus, who was part of the national team at the 1924 Summer Olympics and also at the 1928 Summer Olympics.

References

External links
 

1903 births
1968 deaths
Dutch male backstroke swimmers
Dutch male water polo players
Olympic swimmers of the Netherlands
Olympic water polo players of the Netherlands
Swimmers at the 1924 Summer Olympics
Water polo players at the 1928 Summer Olympics
Sportspeople from Rotterdam
20th-century Dutch people